Professor Moshood Abiola Peller (1941, in Iseyin – 2 August 1997, in Onipanu) was a Nigerian magician and one of Africa's most renowned magicians.

Life
Born Folorunsho Abiola, Peller attended Moslem School, Iseyin and Native Authority Primary School, Iseyin. He started performing illusion tricks in 1954 travelling to Ibadan, Lagos and Oyo for performance. In 1959, he changed occupation and began work as a representative of G.B.O. and later moved into trading. His interest in illusion continued and in 1964, he attended a school of magical arts in India, he spent 18 months at the school and after completion, settled in Liberia. In 1966, he had his first post-training show at the Federal Palace Hotel, Lagos. He was later assassinated in 1997.

References

Nigerian magicians
1941 births
1997 deaths